QQPlayer is a multimedia player developed by Tencent for Windows and Android platforms. It is versatile software that can play various video and audio formats, including AVI, MP4, FLV, MKV, and MP3.

The software has many features that make it a popular choice among users. QQPlayer for Windows includes additional features such as screen capture, video conversion, and 3D video playback. It also allows users to preview incomplete downloaded files and supports playback of damaged or incomplete AVI files.

References

Tencent software